

WPS Regular Season & Playoffs

See also
List of Saint Louis Athletica seasons

Head To Head